Federal Government College may refer to various schools in Nigeria:
 Federal Government College, Kano
 Federal Government College, Kiyawa
 Federal Government College, Sokoto
 Federal Government Girls College, Minjibir
 Federal Government College Enugu
 Federal Government Girls College Onitsha
 Federal Government College, Idoani
 Federal Government College, Minna
 Federal Government College Ikot Ekpene
 Federal Government College Lagos
 Federal Government College, Odogbolu
 Federal Government College Ogbomoso
 Federal Government College, Kaduna
 Federal Government Girls College, Lejja